The 2010 Asia-Pacific Rally Championship season is an international rally championship sanctioned by the FIA.

With four-time champion Cody Crocker no longer contesting the series, it was expected to be a more open championship, and so it has proven. After five rounds of the series 1999 champion Katsuhiko Taguchi holds a three-point lead over fellow Mitsubishi driver Gaurav Gill. Taguchi won the first event of the series at Malaysia and was first registered competitor home in Japan behind veteran campaigner Toshi Arai (Subaru), but disappointing rallies in New Zealand and Australia left his early lead vulnerable. Gill was second in Malaysia and collected the points for third in Japan. Gill broke through for a points win at the Rally of Queensland, finishing over two minutes behind overall event winner, Australian Rally Championship competitor, Simon Evans (Subaru).

Subaru driver Rifat Sungkar got his breakthrough points win at the New Caledonia rally, finishing second behind Pacific Cup registered racer Brendan Reeves (Subaru), putting the Indonesian driver in a clear third.

The only factory team in the series the Proton R3 Malaysia Rally Team, entered a pair of S2000 class Proton Satrias for former WRC drivers Chris Atkinson and Alister McRae. The pair have pushed hard for podium finishes but have had reliability issues developing completely new cars.

With the completion of Rallye de Nouvelle Calédonie, the Pacific Cup was completed. Australian driver Brendan Reeves rounded off the competition with an outright win and claiming the Pacific Cup, which takes in the Australia, New Zealand and New Caledonia rallies. Reeves scored almost double the points of New Zealand Production World Rally Championship competitor, Hayden Paddon (Mitsubishi). Paddon tied for second with Glen Raymond (Mitsubishi) and Brian Green.

The Asia Cup still has one round to run, Taguchi leads by two points over Gill with Hiroshi Yanagisawa third also in a Mitsubishi.

Race calendar and results
The 2010 APRC was as follows:

* Not registered for APRC points.

Championship standings
The 2010 APRC for Drivers points was as follows:

References

External links
Official website
APRC Live Podcast
APRC News and Video

Asia-Pacific Rally Championship seasons
Asia-Pacific Rally
Rally
Rally